General William Hassell Eden (1800 – 10 December 1882) was a career officer in the British Army, holding the position of Colonel of the 90th Light Infantry from 1862 to 1881. He purchased his commission in 1814 and actively served until his death. He also served as the acting Governor of Bermuda from 1852 to 1853. He was also the grandson of Sir Robert Eden, 1st Baronet, of Maryland.

Early life 
William was born in 1800 the illegitimate son of William Thomas Eden and Rose Hassell. He was baptised in the parish of St. Peter in Suffolk, with the register reading "Baptised April 18th William Eden, illegitimate son of Rose Hassell.".

Military service 

Following his education as a gentleman cadet at Sandhurst, William was commissioned into the 6th Regiment of Foot on the 31 March 1814 as an ensign, serving in France and with the occupying army following Waterloo until 1818.

On 22 June 1820 he purchased the rank of lieutenant, and then the rank of captain on 31 July 1823 and the rank of major on 29 August 1826.

In July 1829 he is listed as coming off the half pay list and back into active service as a major of the 88th Foot.

In August 1839 he was promoted to lieutenant colonel of the 56th Foot.

Later life 

He was married to Frances Georgina Rushbrooke in 1832, and they went on to have six children; Fanny Louisa Eden in 1833, William Rushbrooke Eden in 1834, Harriet Mary Eden in 1837, Augusta Frederika Eden in 1839, Archibald Duffield Eden in 1841 and Charles Davers Eden in 1845.

In 1853 his son William Rushbrooke died in a shooting accident, having been hunting rabbits with friends when the thumb of one slipped on the hammer of their gun whilst it was aimed at William R. Eden's leg. The artery was shot through, and he died later that evening. A grandson was later named after him, William Rushbrooke Eden. Fanny Louisa also died in the same year.

He died on 10 December 1882.

Legacy 
William's son Archibald and three of his grandchildren went on to become successful officers in the British Army, with another grandson becoming a successful Royal Navy officer and another the Government Commissioner for Egyptian Customs.

The National Portrait Gallery holds a photographic portrait of him, and another photograph that includes him and his wife.

References 

1800 births
1882 deaths
Graduates of the Royal Military College, Sandhurst
Eden family
British Army generals